The following is an alphabetical list of articles related to the U.S. state of Oklahoma.

0–9 

.ok.us – Internet second-level domain for the state of Oklahoma
46th state to join the United States of America

A
Adams-Onís Treaty of 1819
Adjacent states:

Agriculture in Oklahoma
Airports in Oklahoma
Amusement parks in Oklahoma
Aquaria in Oklahoma
commons:Category:Aquaria in Oklahoma
Arboreta in Oklahoma
commons:Category:Arboreta in Oklahoma
Archaeology of Oklahoma
:Category:Archaeological sites in Oklahoma
commons:Category:Archaeological sites in Oklahoma
Architecture of Oklahoma
Area codes in Oklahoma
Art museums and galleries in Oklahoma
commons:Category:Art museums and galleries in Oklahoma
Astronomical observatories in Oklahoma
commons:Category:Astronomical observatories in Oklahoma
Attorney General of the State of Oklahoma

B
Botanical gardens in Oklahoma
commons:Category:Botanical gardens in Oklahoma
Buildings and structures in Oklahoma
commons:Category:Buildings and structures in Oklahoma

C

Capital of the State of Oklahoma
Capitol of the State of Oklahoma
commons:Category:Oklahoma State Capitol
Casinos in Oklahoma
Caves of Oklahoma
commons:Category:Caves of Oklahoma
Census statistical areas of Oklahoma
Cities in Oklahoma
commons:Category:Cities in Oklahoma
Climate of Oklahoma
Colleges and universities in Oklahoma
commons:Category:Universities and colleges in Oklahoma
Communications in Oklahoma
commons:Category:Communications in Oklahoma
Companies in Oklahoma
Congressional districts of Oklahoma
Constitution of the State of Oklahoma
Convention centers in Oklahoma
commons:Category:Convention centers in Oklahoma
Counties of the State of Oklahoma
commons:Category:Counties in Oklahoma
COVID-19 pandemic in Oklahoma
Culture of Oklahoma
:Category:Oklahoma culture
commons:Category:Oklahoma culture

D
Democratic Party of Oklahoma
Demographics of Oklahoma

E
Economy of Oklahoma
:Category:Economy of Oklahoma
commons:Category:Economy of Oklahoma
Education in Oklahoma
:Category:Education in Oklahoma
commons:Category:Education in Oklahoma
Elections in the State of Oklahoma
:Category:Oklahoma elections
commons:Category:Oklahoma elections
Environment of Oklahoma
commons:Category:Environment of Oklahoma

F

Flag of the State of Oklahoma
Former highway routes in Oklahoma
Forts in Oklahoma
:Category:Forts in Oklahoma
commons:Category:Forts in Oklahoma

G
Geography of Oklahoma
:Category:Geography of Oklahoma
commons:Category:Geography of Oklahoma
Geology of Oklahoma
:Category:Geology of Oklahoma
commons:Category:Geology of Oklahoma
Ghost towns in Oklahoma
:Category:Ghost towns in Oklahoma
commons:Category:Ghost towns in Oklahoma
Golf clubs and courses in Oklahoma
Government of the State of Oklahoma  website
:Category:Government of Oklahoma
commons:Category:Government of Oklahoma
Governor of the State of Oklahoma
List of governors of Oklahoma
Great Seal of the State of Oklahoma
Guthrie, Oklahoma, territorial and state capital 1889-1910

H
Heritage railroads in Oklahoma
commons:Category:Heritage railroads in Oklahoma
High schools of Oklahoma
Higher education in Oklahoma
Highway routes in Oklahoma
Hiking trails in Oklahoma
commons:Category:Hiking trails in Oklahoma
History of Oklahoma
Historical outline of Oklahoma
Hospitals in Oklahoma
House of Representatives of the State of Oklahoma

I
Images of Oklahoma
commons:Category:Oklahoma
Indian territory, 1834–1907

J

K

L
Lakes in Oklahoma
:Category:Lakes of Oklahoma
commons:Category:Lakes of Oklahoma
Landmarks in Oklahoma
commons:Category:Landmarks in Oklahoma
Libertarian Party of Oklahoma
Lieutenant Governor of the State of Oklahoma
Lists related to the State of Oklahoma:
List of airports in Oklahoma
List of census-designated places in Oklahoma
List of census statistical areas in Oklahoma
List of cities in Oklahoma
List of colleges and universities in Oklahoma
List of counties in Oklahoma
List of earthquakes in Oklahoma
List of former highway routes in Oklahoma
List of forts in Oklahoma
List of ghost towns in Oklahoma
List of governors of Oklahoma
List of high schools in Oklahoma
List of highway routes in Oklahoma
List of hospitals in Oklahoma
List of individuals executed in Oklahoma
List of lakes in Oklahoma
List of law enforcement agencies in Oklahoma
List of museums in Oklahoma
List of National Historic Landmarks in Oklahoma
List of newspapers in Oklahoma
List of people from Oklahoma
List of radio stations in Oklahoma
List of railroads in Oklahoma
List of Registered Historic Places in Oklahoma
List of rivers of Oklahoma
List of school districts in Oklahoma
List of state parks in Oklahoma
List of state prisons in Oklahoma
List of symbols of the State of Oklahoma
List of telephone area codes in Oklahoma
List of television stations in Oklahoma
List of towns in Oklahoma
List of United States congressional delegations from Oklahoma
List of United States congressional districts in Oklahoma
List of United States representatives from Oklahoma
List of United States senators from Oklahoma
Louisiana Purchase of 1803

M
Maps of Oklahoma
Mass media in Oklahoma
Monuments and memorials in Oklahoma
commons:Category:Monuments and memorials in Oklahoma
Mountains of Oklahoma
commons:Category:Mountains of Oklahoma
Museums in Oklahoma
:Category:Museums in Oklahoma
commons:Category:Museums in Oklahoma
Music of Oklahoma
:Category:Music of Oklahoma
commons:Category:Music of Oklahoma
:Category:Musical groups from Oklahoma
:Category:Musicians from Oklahoma

N
National Forests of Oklahoma
commons:Category:National Forests of Oklahoma
Natural history of Oklahoma
commons:Category:Natural history of Oklahoma
Newspapers of Oklahoma

O
OK – United States Postal Service postal code for the State of Oklahoma
Oklahoma  website
:Category:Oklahoma
commons:Category:Oklahoma
commons:Category:Maps of Oklahoma
Oklahoma Ballot State Question 790
Oklahoma City, state capital since 1910
:Category:Oklahoma City
commons:Category:Oklahoma City, Oklahoma
Oklahoma Club Collegiate Soccer League
Oklahoma CyberKnife
Oklahoma Native Plant Society
Oklahoma Right To Farm SQ 777
Oklahoma State Capitol
Oklahoma Territory
Oklahomans for Children and Families
Outdoor sculptures in Oklahoma
commons:Category:Outdoor sculptures in Oklahoma

P
People from Oklahoma
:Category:People from Oklahoma
commons:Category:People from Oklahoma
:Category:People by city in Oklahoma
:Category:People by county in Oklahoma
:Category:People from Oklahoma by occupation
Politics of Oklahoma
:Category:Politics of Oklahoma
commons:Category:Politics of Oklahoma
Libertarian Party of Oklahoma
Oklahoma Democratic Party
Oklahoma Republican Party
Socialist Party of Oklahoma
Protected areas of Oklahoma
commons:Category:Protected areas of Oklahoma

Q

R
Radio stations in Oklahoma
Railroad museums in Oklahoma
commons:Category:Railroad museums in Oklahoma
Railroads in Oklahoma
Registered historic places in Oklahoma
commons:Category:Registered Historic Places in Oklahoma
Religion in Oklahoma
:Category:Religion in Oklahoma
commons:Category:Religion in Oklahoma
Republican Party of Oklahoma
Rivers of Oklahoma
commons:Category:Rivers of Oklahoma

S
School districts of Oklahoma
Scouting in Oklahoma
Senate of the State of Oklahoma
Settlements in Oklahoma
Cities in Oklahoma
Towns in Oklahoma
Census Designated Places in Oklahoma
Other unincorporated communities in Oklahoma
List of ghost towns in Oklahoma
 Socialist Party of Oklahoma
Sports in Oklahoma
:Category:Sports in Oklahoma
commons:Category:Sports in Oklahoma
:Category:Sports venues in Oklahoma
commons:Category:Sports venues in Oklahoma
State Capitol of Oklahoma
State of Oklahoma  website
Constitution of the State of Oklahoma
Government of the State of Oklahoma
:Category:Government of Oklahoma
commons:Category:Government of Oklahoma
Executive branch of the government of the State of Oklahoma
Governor of the State of Oklahoma
Legislative branch of the government of the State of Oklahoma
Legislature of the State of Oklahoma
Senate of the State of Oklahoma
House of Representatives of the State of Oklahoma
Judicial branch of the government of the State of Oklahoma
Supreme Court of the State of Oklahoma
State parks of Oklahoma
commons:Category:State parks of Oklahoma
State prisons of Oklahoma
Structures in Oklahoma
commons:Category:Buildings and structures in Oklahoma
Supreme Court of the State of Oklahoma
Symbols of the State of Oklahoma
:Category:Symbols of Oklahoma
commons:Category:Symbols of Oklahoma

T
Telecommunications in Oklahoma
commons:Category:Communications in Oklahoma
Telephone area codes in Oklahoma
Television shows set in Oklahoma
Television stations in Oklahoma
Territory of Arkansas, (1819–1828)-1836
Territory of Louisiana, 1805–1812
Territory of Missouri, (1812–1819)-1821
Territory of Oklahoma, 1890–1907
Theatres in Oklahoma
commons:Category:Theatres in Oklahoma
Tourism in Oklahoma  website
commons:Category:Tourism in Oklahoma
Towns in Oklahoma
commons:Category:Cities in Oklahoma
Trail of Tears, 1830–1838
Transportation in Oklahoma
:Category:Transportation in Oklahoma
commons:Category:Transport in Oklahoma
Treaty of Guadalupe Hidalgo of 1848
Tulsa, Oklahoma
:Category:Tulsa, Oklahoma
commons:Category:Tulsa, Oklahoma

 Tulsa race massacre

U
United States of America
States of the United States of America
United States census statistical areas of Oklahoma
United States congressional delegations from Oklahoma
United States congressional districts in Oklahoma
United States Court of Appeals for the Tenth Circuit
United States District Court for the Eastern District of Oklahoma
United States District Court for the Northern District of Oklahoma
United States District Court for the Western District of Oklahoma
United States representatives from Oklahoma
United States senators from Oklahoma
Universities and colleges in Oklahoma
commons:Category:Universities and colleges in Oklahoma
US-OK – ISO 3166-2:US region code for the State of Oklahoma

V
Vian, Oklahoma
Vinita, Oklahoma

W
Water parks in Oklahoma
Waterfalls of Oklahoma
commons:Category:Waterfalls of Oklahoma
Wikimedia
Wikimedia Commons:Category:Oklahoma
commons:Category:Maps of Oklahoma
Wikinews:Category:Oklahoma
Wikinews:Portal:Oklahoma
Wikipedia Category:Oklahoma
Wikipedia Portal:Oklahoma
Wikipedia:WikiProject Oklahoma
:Category:WikiProject Oklahoma articles
Wikipedia:WikiProject Oklahoma#Participants

X

Y

Z
Zoos in Oklahoma
commons:Category:Zoos in Oklahoma

See also

Topic overview:
Oklahoma
Outline of Oklahoma

Oklahoma
 
Oklahoma